Nižný Slavkov is a village and municipality in Sabinov District in the Prešov Region of north-eastern Slovakia.

History
In historical records the village was first mentioned in 1214.

Geography
The municipality lies at an altitude of 516 metres and covers an area of 23.142 km2. It has a population of about 790 people.

External links
https://web.archive.org/web/20100202015957/http://www.statistics.sk/mosmis/eng/run.html

Villages and municipalities in Sabinov District
Šariš